The 2004 Philadelphia Wings season marked the team's eighteenth season of operation.

Regular season

Conference standings

Game log
Reference:

Roster
Reference:

See also
 Philadelphia Wings
 2004 NLL season

References

Philadelphia Wings seasons
Philadelphia Wings Season, 2004
Philadelphia Wings